Sacré Cœur (or Sacré Coeur) is French for Sacred Heart. It may refer to:

Places
 Sacré-Coeur, Quebec, a municipality in Canada
 Sacré-Cœur-de-Crabtree, now known as Crabtree, Quebec, a municipality in Canada
 Sacré-Cœur-de-Jésus, Quebec, a municipality in Canada
 Mermoz-Sacré-Cœur, a commune d'arrondissement in the city of Dakar, Senegal

Institutions
 Sacré-Cœur, Paris, a Roman Catholic church and minor basilica in Paris, France
 Hôpital du Sacré-Cœur de Montréal, a hospital in Montreal, Quebec, Canada

Schools
 Sacré Cœur School, a school in Glen Iris, a South Eastern suburb of Melbourne, Victoria, Australia
 Collège du Sacré-Coeur (Egypt), a Catholic school located in Cairo, Egypt
 École secondaire du Sacré-Cœur, a French language catholic secondary school in Greater Sudbury, Ontario, Canada
 Institution du Sacré-Cœur, a Catholic school in Port-au-Prince, Haiti

See also
Sacred Heart (disambiguation)
Sacro Cuore (disambiguation)